Kambou is a surname. Notable people with the name include:

Bèbè Kambou (born 1982), Burkinabé footballer
Hervé Kambou (born 1985),  Ivorian footballer 
Romeo Kambou (born 1980), Burkinabé footballer
Sarah Degnan Kambou, president of the International Center for Research on Women (ICRW)